William Luther Andrews (February 9, 1865 – July 19, 1936) was an American Democratic politician who served as a member of the Virginia Senate, representing the state's 4th district.

References

External links
 
 

1865 births
1936 deaths
Democratic Party Virginia state senators
People from Albemarle County, Virginia
University of Virginia alumni
20th-century American politicians